Jane from Occupied Europe (stylised as ...In "Jane from Occupied Europe") is the second and final album by English post-punk band Swell Maps. It was released in 1980 by Rather Records and Rough Trade Records. In 1989, the album was reissued with eight bonus tracks by Mute Records.

The album title was adapted by a band eight years later, who told NME, "Swell Maps thought up some really great titles and, er… we just ripped it off."

Critical reception 

In 2016, Paste ranked Jane from Occupied Europe at number 42 on its list of the best post-punk albums. In 2018, Pitchfork listed it as the 165th best album of the 1980s. Pitchforks Judy Berman wrote: "Swell Maps pasted mostly incomprehensible, drawled vocals into noisy, krautrock-inspired sound collages, straying further beyond the boundaries of any existing genre with each release. Their second album, Jane from Occupied Europe, marked the culmination of that trajectory. It was, most of all, a catalog of thrilling new sounds".

Track listing 
Side one
 "Robot Factory" (Epic Soundtracks, Richard Earl) – 2:27
 "Let's Buy a Bridge" (Nikki Sudden) – 1:55
 "Border Country" (Sudden) – 2:12
 "Cake Shop" (retitled "Cake Shop Girl" on reissue) (Jowe Head) – 2:25
 "The Helicopter Spies" (Sudden) – 4:20
 "Big Maz in "The Desert from the Trolley"" (Swell Maps) – 5:11
 "Big Empty Field" (Soundtracks, Earl) – 3:44
 "Mining Villages" (Soundtracks, Phones B. Sportsman) – 1:01

Side two
 "Collision with a Frogman vs. The Mangrove Delta Plan" (Swell Maps) – 8:06
 "Secret Island" (Sudden) – 4:34
 "Whatever Happens Next...." (Sudden) – 2:58
 "Blenheim Shots" (Sudden) – 3:42
 "A Raincoat's Room" (retitled "Raining in My Room" on reissue) (Soundtracks) – 1:42

Reissue bonus tracks
"Let's Build a Car" (Sudden) – 3:06
"Epic's Trip" (Soundtracks) – 0:55
"...uh..." (Swell Maps) – 0:31
"Secret Island" (instrumental) (Sudden) – 6:27
"Amphitheatres" (Swell Maps) – 2:56
"Big Empty Field" (No. 2) (Soundtracks, Earl) – 2:59
"The Stairs are Like an Avalanche" (Swell Maps) – 4:04
"...then Poland" (Swell Maps) – 0:52
"New York" (Sudden) – 3:19

Personnel 
 Epic Soundtracks - Drums (1-7,9-12), Organ (1,10), Toys (1,6,7), Backing Vocals (2,5,10,11), Piano (3,6,9,13), Handclaps (5,9), Violin (6), Mumbling (6,13), Guitar (7), Saxophone (7), Concrete (8), Typewriter (8)
 Nikki Sudden – Guitar (1-5,9-12), Toys (1,6), Vocals (2,3,5,10-12), Organ (4,12), Handclaps (5,9), Bass (6), Eiderdown (6), Mumbling (6), Piano (11)
 Jowe Head – Guitar (1,4,7), Toys (1), Bass (2-5,9-11), Saxophone (2,7), Backing Vocals (2,3,10,11), Vocals (4), Pianoforte (6)
 Richard Earl – Organ (1), Toys (1,6), Guitar (2,4-7,9-12), Backing Vocals (2,10), Electric Guitar (3), Acoustic Guitar (3), Handclaps (5,9), Vocals (5,11), Mumbling (6), Bass (7)
 David Barrington – Guitar (5), Twelve String Guitar (6), Violin (6), Kazoo (8), Vocals (8), Handclaps (9), Backing Vocals (10)
 John Cockrill – Handclaps (5), Backing Vocals (5), Bass (12)
 Barry Gray – Organ (2)

References

External links 
 

1980 albums
Mute Records albums
Rough Trade Records albums
Swell Maps albums